Emma Hauck (14 August 1878 – 1 April 1920) was a German outsider artist known for her artistic, handwritten letters to her husband while she was institutionalized in a mental hospital. Though these letters were never delivered, they have since come to be regarded as works of art due to their abstraction and repetitive content. In many cases the letters consist of only the words "Come sweetheart" or "Come" written over and over in flowing script.

Biography
Emma Hauck was born in Ellwangen, Germany, on 14 August 1878. 
On February 7, 1909, she was admitted to the psychiatric hospital at the University of Heidelberg at the age of 30, diagnosed with dementia praecox due to severe psychosis. She had married a schoolteacher four years earlier, and was also the mother of two daughters, her husband and family being subjects of her psychosis. While institutionalized, Hauck wrote a series of letters to her husband which later were considered to be artworks, though she likely did not consider them works of art herself. Hauck was released from Heidelberg after a brief stay, though she was later terminally institutionalized at Wiesloch asylum. Hauck died on 1 April 1920 in Anstalt Wiesloch. Her letters are held in the Prinzhorn Collection, Heidelberg, where they were discovered during the time of her death.

Letters
The letters themselves, taken as art, can be considered a form of calligraphy. They also share similarities to asemic writing, in which priority is given primarily to the aesthetic value of the written word, not to its linguistic meaning. Hauck never intended to make art, but among the dozen impassioned letters she wrote in 1909 to her husband are heart-wrenching visual creations whose aesthetic features are beautiful artistic achievements-even though they are expressions of desperate helplessness.  Hauck's writing fills the entire page of her letters, in most cases consisting of the repeated phrase "Sweetheart come" (German Herzensschatzi komm and in some instances merely "come" (German "komm"). These phrases or words are written in incredibly dense and at times illegible constructions which also vary in shading and value. Hauck's words form dark, vibrating vertical columns on the page act as expressive abstraction and seem aesthetically pleasing, until her plea, her mantra "komm komm komm" to a lover who will never receive her letters is made obvious and the abstract beauty turns terribly poignant. Hauck's motivation for writing these letters is unknown, whether she believed that the repetitive writing itself would effect the result she desired or whether it was the only way for her to retain a sense of an increasingly fractured identity, although due to her constant discussion of her family while in mental institutions they are thought to be an expression of her loneliness.

Legacy
Hauck's letters were included in the 2000 exhibition The Prinzhorn Collection: Traces Upon the Wunderblock at the Drawing Center, New York. 

In 2000, the Brothers Quay directed the film In Absentia, documenting Hauck's letters. It was included in the 2013 exhibition Quay Brothers: On Deciphering the Pharmacist’s Prescription for Lip-Reading Puppets at the Museum of Modern Art, New York. 

In 2019, the Utah-based Pygmalion Theatre company produced the play Sweetheart Come based on Hauck's letters and her life story.

In 2021, Amsterdam based photographer Nanouk Prins published a photobook called Empty Forest, based on the letters of Emma Hauck.

Bibliography 

 Écrits d’Art Brut. Graphomanes extravagants, Lucienne Peiry, Paris, Le Seuil, 2020.

References

1878 births
1920 deaths
Outsider artists
Women outsider artists
People with schizophrenia
German letter writers
Women letter writers
20th-century German artists
20th-century German women artists
People from Ellwangen